Samson Singh (born 16 January 1989) is an Indian cricketer. He made his first-class debut for Manipur in the 2018–19 Ranji Trophy on 6 December 2018.

References

External links
 

1989 births
Living people
Indian cricketers
Place of birth missing (living people)
Manipur cricketers